is a museum dedicated to Japanese monk and sculptor Enkū in the city of Seki, Gifu Prefecture, Japan. Enkū was born in Mino Province, present-day Gifu Prefecture, in 1632 and died in Seki in 1695.

See also

 Japanese sculpture

References

External links
  Homepage

Seki, Gifu
Museums in Gifu Prefecture
Museums of Japanese art
Art museums and galleries in Japan
Biographical museums in Japan
Buddhist museums
Museums established in 2003
Religious buildings and structures completed in 2003
Religious organizations established in 2004
2003 establishments in Japan